Opharus linus is a moth of the family Erebidae. It was described by Herbert Druce in 1897. It is found in Mexico.

References

Opharus
Moths described in 1897
Moths of Central America